Juan García Jiménez (7 January 1934 – 5 January 2023), better known as Mondeño, was a Spanish torero.

Biography
Coming from a low-income family, García entered bullfighting as a means of earning a living. He made his debut on horses in El Puerto de Santa María on 24 June 1956.

After a very serious injury in 1970, he permanently retired and married his fiancée, Lolita Casado. After his retirement, he moved to Paris.

Mondeño died in Sanlúcar la Mayor on 5 January 2023, at the age of 88.

References

1934 births
2023 deaths
Spanish bullfighters
Sportspeople from the Province of Cádiz
People from Puerto Real